Barney Therrien (born c. 1940) is a former Canadian football player who played for the Edmonton Eskimos and BC Lions. He played college football at the University of Washington.

References

1940s births
Living people
Washington Huskies football players
American football defensive tackles
Canadian football defensive linemen
Edmonton Elks players
BC Lions players